The Dinosaurs! is an American television miniseries produced by WHYY-TV for PBS in 1992, featuring some of the then-modern theories about dinosaurs and how they lived. It aired four episodes from November 22 to November 25, 1992.

The program
The program features the age of dinosaurs, from the appearing of the early forms like Herrerasaurus, to the Tyrannosaurus and Ceratopsians of the late Cretaceous. The possibilities whether dinosaurs were active, warm-blooded animals, had parental care, and the theory that they are the ancestors to birds are featured. What caused their extinction is also discussed.

Episodes
 Part 1 - The Monsters Emerge
 Part 2 - Flesh on the Bones
 Part 3 - The Nature of the Beast
 Part 4 - The Death of the Dinosaur

Dinosaurs and other prehistoric animals

 Alioramus
 Allosaurus
 Ammonite
 Ankylosaurus
 Apatosaurus
 Archaeopteryx
 Archelon
 Barosaurus
 Baryonyx
 Brachiosaurus
 Brontosaurus
 Caenagnathus
 Camarasaurus
 Camptosaurus
 Carnotaurus
 Centrosaurus
 Ceratosaurus
 Chirostenotes
 Coelacanth (seen in the animation background in The Death of the Dinosaur)
 Coelophysis
 Compsognathus
 Corythosaurus
 Cryptoclidus
 Deinonychus
 Desmatosuchus
 Dilophosaurus
 Dimorphodon
 Diplodocus
 Dryosaurus
 Edmontosaurus
 Eoraptor

 Euoplocephalus
 Herrerasaurus
 Heterodontosaurus
 Hylaeosaurus
 Hypacrosaurus
 Hypsilophodon
 Ichthyosaurus
 Iguanodon
 Lambeosaurus
 Lesothosaurus
 Lexovisaurus
 Maiasaura
 Megalosaurus
 Microceratus
 Mixosaurus
 Mosasaurus
 Oviraptor
 Ornitholestes
 Ornithomimus
 Orodromeus
 Pachycephalosaurus
 Pachyrhinosaurus
 Parasaurolophus
 Pinacosaurus
 Plateosaurus
 Postosuchus
 Protoceratops
 Pteranodon (seen in the animation background in Flesh on the Bones)
 Pterodactylus
 Quetzalcoatlus
 Rhamphorhynchus

 Riojasaurus
 Saltasaurus
 Saurosuchus
 Scelidosaurus
 Scutellosaurus
 Stegosaurus
 Scolosaurus
 Struthiomimus
 Styracosaurus
 Saurolophus
 Triceratops
 Troodon
 Tyrannosaurus
 Velociraptor
 Xiphactinus
 Wuerhosaurus

Animations
Some animated depictions were made to give an impression of how the dinosaurs might or could have looked and how they might or would have behaved. Those animations have been featured in other media since. Some of them have been available to see in public computers at Swedish Museum of Natural History. Many of the animations have also been uploaded on YouTube.

Home video
The series was released on VHS and laserdisc in 1993.  The VHS edition was re-issued on November 10, 1998 with different package artwork. It was re-issued again on November 2, 1999.  There have been no plans or discussions for a DVD or Blu-ray release.

References

Sources
 https://www.amazon.com/Dinosaurs-Nature-Beast-Barbara-Feldon/dp/6303196152.
 http://movies.nytimes.com/movie/189451/The-Dinosaurs-The-Nature-of-the-Beast/overview.
 http://www.lddb.com/laserdisc/31515/L-PBS-1029-6/Dinosaurs!-The-%281992%29.

Documentary television series about dinosaurs
PBS original programming
1990s American television miniseries
1992 American television series debuts
1992 American television series endings